Ben-Zion Keshet (born 1914, died 8 August 1984) was an Israeli politician who served as a member of the Knesset for Gahal and Likud between 1969 and 1977.

Biography
Born in Riga in the Russian Empire (today in Latvia), Keshet attended a Hebrew high school in his home city. He joined the Betar youth movement and helped establish the Estonian branch in 1932. In 1934 he made aliyah to Mandatory Palestine, where he became a member of the governing council of Betar in 1935. He also became a member of Betar's enlistment battalion and of the central committee of the National Labour Federation in Eretz-Israel, on which he served between 1939 and 1942. From 1942 until 1943 he was a member of the general staff of the Irgun, before being exiled to Eritrea in 1944.

He returned to Israel in 1948 and was amongst the founding members of Herut, chairing its municipal department. He was a member of the Public Council for Soviet Jewry and was on the Controller Committee of Housing Ministry. In 1969 he was elected to the Knesset on the Gahal list (an alliance of Herut and the Liberal Party) and became a Deputy Speaker. He was re-elected in 1973, by which time Gahal had merged into Likud, but lost his seat in the 1977 elections. Between 1982 and 1984 he was chairman of the board of directors at the Jabotinsky Institute, before dying in August 1984.

References

External links

1914 births
1984 deaths
Latvian Jews
Latvian emigrants to Mandatory Palestine
Betar members
Irgun members
Gahal politicians
Herut politicians
Likud politicians
Members of the 7th Knesset (1969–1974)
Members of the 8th Knesset (1974–1977)
Deputy Speakers of the Knesset